Theta functions  are special functions of several complex variables. Theta function may also refer to:

Jacobi-related functions 
q-theta function, a type of q-series
Theta function of a lattice, a holomorphic function on the upper half-plane
Mock theta functions, etc., a mock modular form of weight 1/2
Ramanujan theta function, 
Neville theta functions

Other functions 
Riemann–Siegel theta function, 
Chebyshev function, 
Feferman's function, 
Heaviside step function, sometimes denoted 
Lovász theta function, an upper bound on the Shannon capacity of a graph

See also
Jacobi theta functions (notational variations),